Alexandra Dzigalyuk (born ) is a retired Kazakhstani female volleyball player. She was part of the Kazakhstan women's national volleyball team.

She participated in the 2007 FIVB Volleyball World Grand Prix.

References

External links
 

1970 births
Living people
Kazakhstani women's volleyball players
Place of birth missing (living people)
21st-century Kazakhstani women